Typhlops jamaicensis, also known as the Jamaican blind snake or Jamaica worm snake, is a species of snake in the Typhlopidae family.

References

jamaicensis
Reptiles described in 1802